Khrabrina Khrabrova (born 2 June 1973) is a Bulgarian gymnast. She competed in six events at the 1988 Summer Olympics.

References

External links
 

1973 births
Living people
Bulgarian female artistic gymnasts
Olympic gymnasts of Bulgaria
Gymnasts at the 1988 Summer Olympics
Sportspeople from Varna, Bulgaria